The ABC Champions Cup 1999 was the 10th staging of the ABC Champions Cup, the basketball club tournament of Asian Basketball Confederation. The tournament was held in Beirut, Lebanon between May 22 to 29, 1999.

Preliminary round

Group A

Group B

{{basketballbox|place=Ghazir Club Court, Beirut
|date= May 24 | teamA= JBL  |scoreA= 72 | teamB=  Orthodox |scoreB=64 }}

Knockout round
5th–8th places

Championship

Semifinals

Finals

Final standings

AwardsMost Valuable Player:  Assane N'Diaye (Sagesse)Most Valuable Coach:  Ghassan Sarkis (Sagesse) &  Felton Sealey (Petronas)Best Three Point Shooter:  Elie Mechantaf (Sagesse)Best Scorer:  Jason Woodard (Liaoning)Best Sixth Man:  Vicken Eskedjian (Sagesse)Best Sportsmanship''':  Elie Mechantaf (Sagesse)

References
Results
www.sagessefans.com

1999
Champions Cup
B
Basketball Asia Champions Cup 1999